Wheat salad, is a salad of Arab salads, it typically consists of wheat, corn, tomatoes, carrots, cucumber pickles, lemon, parsley, olive oil and salt.

See also
 List of Arab salads
 List of salads

References

Arab cuisine
Salads